Many surgical procedure names can be broken into parts to indicate the meaning. For example, in gastrectomy, "ectomy" is a suffix meaning the removal of a part of the body. "Gastro-" means stomach. Thus, gastrectomy refers to the surgical removal of the stomach (or sections thereof).  "Otomy" means cutting into a part of the body;  a gastrotomy would be cutting into, but not necessarily removing, the stomach. And also "pharyngo" means pharynx, "laryngo" means larynx, "esophag" means esophagus. Thus, "pharyngolaryngoesophagectomy" refers to the surgical removal of the three.

The field of minimally invasive surgery has spawned another set of words, such as arthroscopic or laparoscopic surgery.  These take the same form as above;  an arthroscope is a device which allows the inside of the joint to be seen.

List of common surgery terms

Prefixes
 mono- : one, from the Greek μόνος, "only, single"
 angio- : related to a blood vessel, from the Greek αγγήϊον , "vessel", "containter", "pot"
 arthr- : related to a joint, from the Greek άρθρον, "joint"
 bi- : two, from the Latin prefix *bi, meaning "two".
 colono- : related to large intestine colon, from the latin , "clause [of a poem]", itself from the Greek χωλον, chōlon, "clause, member, part"
 colpo- : related to the vagina, from the Ancient Greek χόλπος, meaning "hollow space", but also a synonym for "womb"
 cysto- : related to the bladder, from the Greek χύστις, "bladder, pouch" 
 gastr- : related to stomach, from the Greek γαστήρ, "stomach"
 hepat- : related to the liver, from the latin , from the latin , Greek loanword, originally ηπαρ, meaning "liver"
 hyster- : related to the uterus, from Neo-Latin hysteria, itself ultimately from the Greek ύστέρα, meaning "womb, uterus"
 lamino- : related to the lamina (posterior aspect of vertebra)
 lapar- : related to the abdominal cavity
 Etymology actually refers to soft, fleshy part of abdominal wall. The term celio- is generally considered more accurate and more commonly used in America.
 mammo- and masto-: related to the breasts, from the latin mammas, "breast", and Greek μάσταζ mástaz, "chewer"
 myo- : related to muscle tissue, from the Greek μυς, mús, from μύσκυλος , "little mouse", so called because the Greeks believed that muscles looked like little mice.
 nephro- : related to the kidney from the Greek νεφρόν, accusative declension of νεφρός, kidney
 oophor- : related to the ovary, from ωοφόρος, meaning "egg-bearing"
 orchid- : related to the testicles, from the latin , itself from the Greek όρχις, meaning "testicle" or sometimes "orchid" so called because the Greeks believed orchid roots looked like testicles.
 rhino- : related to the nose, from the Greek ρινός , genitive declension of ρίς , "nose"
 thoraco- : related to the chest
 vas- : related to a duct, usually the vas deferens, from the latin , meaning "vessel", or "vein"

Suffixes
 -centesis : surgical puncture
 -tripsy : crushing or breaking up
 -desis : fusion of two parts into one, stabilization
 -ectomy : surgical removal (see List of -ectomies). The term 'resection' is also used, especially when referring to a tumor.
 -opsy : looking at
 -oscopy : viewing of, normally with a scope
 -ostomy or -stomy : surgically creating a hole (a new "mouth" or "stoma", from the Greek στόμα (stóma), meaning "body", see List of -ostomies)
 -otomy or -tomy : surgical incision (see List of -otomies)
 -pexy : to fix or secure
 -plasty : to modify or reshape (sometimes entails replacement with a prosthesis), from the Ancient Greek πλάστος, plástos, meaning "molded".
 -rrhaphy : to strengthen, usually with suture

See also

 Cardiac surgery
 Surgical drain
 Endoscopy
 Fluorescence image-guided surgery
 Hypnosurgery
 Jet ventilation
 List of -ectomies
 List of -otomies
 List of -ostomies
 :Category:Surgical procedures and techniques

External links
 Multimedia Manual of Cardiothoracic Surgery

Surgical procedures and techniques